The Forgotten Heroes are a fictional superhero team in the DC Comics universe.  The group is composed of originally unrelated superheroes introduced in DC publications in the 1940s, 1950s and 1960s. Having faded from appearances in DC publications, Marv Wolfman and Gil Kane brought them together in Action Comics #545 (July 1983) as a team that had simply faded from the limelight of their world.

Fictional team history

Pre-Crisis
In their original adventures prior to the Crisis on Infinite Earths, the Forgotten Heroes are all superheroes who, at one point in their career, had discovered a mysterious golden pyramid.  When they attempt to report the discovery, they find themselves censored by the US Government. The members of the team are brought together by Immortal Man, who reveals to them that the pyramids are the work of his eons-old foe, Vandal Savage. With the aid of Superman, the Forgotten Heroes destroy the golden pyramids and save the Earth.

In Crisis on Infinite Earths #10, Animal Man, Dolphin and Rip Hunter again team up, along with Adam Strange, Captain Comet and the Atomic Knight. This assemblage has been referred to as "the Forgotten Heroes" in retrospect, but was never called that in the Crisis series itself.

The original Forgotten Heroes were opposed by a team of evil counterparts known as the Forgotten Villains. Members of the Forgotten Villains include Atom-Master, Enchantress, Faceless Hunter, Kraklow, Mr. Poseidon, Ultivac, and Yggardis the Living Planet.

Post-Crisis
A new version of the Forgotten Heroes is formed in Resurrection Man #24 (March 1999), when some of the original members mistake Mitch Shelley for a reincarnated Immortal Man.

Membership

Original team
Animal Man (Bernhard "Buddy" Baker)
Calvin "Cave" Carson
Congo Bill/Congorilla (William Glenmorgan)
Dolphin
Dane Dorrance
Rick Flag, Jr.
Rip Hunter
Immortal Man (Klarn)

Later team
Animal Man
Ballistic (Kelvin Mao)
Cave Carson
Fetish (Thula)
The Ray (Ray Terrill)
Resurrection Man (Mitch Shelley)
Vigilante (Pat Trayce)

References

External links
Cosmic Teams: The Forgotten Heroes and Forgotten Villains
DCU Guide: Forgotten Heroes
Unofficial Forgotten Heroes web site
ComicVine: Forgotten Heroes

DC Comics superhero teams